Ranunculus eschscholtzii is a species of buttercup flower known by the common name Eschscholtz's buttercup.

The species name honors Johann Friedrich von Eschscholtz, an Imperial Russian botanist and entomologist active on the West Coast in the 1820s and 1830s.

Distribution and habitat
The plant is native to much of western North America from the Arctic northwestern Canada and Alaska to California and New Mexico. It grows in meadows and talus on high mountain slopes and other open rocky habitat.

Description
Ranunculus eschscholtzii is a perennial herb producing one or more erect stems up to 20 or 25 centimeters tall. The lower leaves have somewhat rounded blades each divided into a few lobes and borne on long petioles. Any upper leaves are smaller and not borne on petioles. The herbage is hairless and sometimes waxy in texture.

The inflorescence is made up of one to three flowers on narrow pedicels. The flower has five to eight oval or rounded shiny yellow petals up to 1.5 centimeters long each around a central nectary with many stamens and pistils.

The fruit is an achene borne in a cluster of 17 or more.

Varieties
Ranunculus eschscholtzii var. eschscholtzii
Ranunculus eschscholtzii var. oxynotus — endemic to the Sierra Nevada and Great Basin ranges in eastern California and western Nevada.
Ranunculus eschscholtzii var. suksdorfii — Suksdorf's buttercup, endemic to the Klamath Mountains.

References

External links
Calflora Database: Ranunculus eschscholtzii (Eschscholtz's buttercup)
Jepson Manual eFlora (TJM2) treatment of Ranunculus eschscholtzii
Washington Burke Museum
UC Photos gallery − Ranunculus eschscholtzii (Eschscholtz's buttercup)

eschscholtzii
Flora of the Northwestern United States
Flora of the Southwestern United States
Flora of Western Canada
Flora of Alaska
Flora of California
Flora of New Mexico
Flora of the Klamath Mountains
Flora of the Rocky Mountains
Flora of the Sierra Nevada (United States)
Johann Friedrich von Eschscholtz
Flora without expected TNC conservation status